The South Sierra Nevada springsnail, scientific name Pyrgulopsis giuliani, is a species of very small freshwater snail with an operculum, an aquatic gastropod mollusk in the family Hydrobiidae.

This species is endemic to the Sierra Nevada in the United States. This species is threatened by habitat loss.

References

 2006 IUCN Red List of Threatened Species.   Downloaded on 7 August 2007.

Pyrgulopsis
Fauna of the Sierra Nevada (United States)
Molluscs of the United States
Gastropods described in 1990
Taxonomy articles created by Polbot